Ng Uk Tsuen is a village in Sheung Shui, North District, Hong Kong.

Administration
Ng Uk Tsuen is a recognized village under the New Territories Small House Policy.

See also
 Yu Tai (constituency)

References

External links

 Delineation of area of existing village Ng Uk Tsuen (Sheung Shui) for election of resident representative (2019 to 2022)
 Antiquities Advisory Board. Historic Building Appraisal. No. 5 Ng Uk Tsuen Pictures

Villages in North District, Hong Kong
Sheung Shui